The Great Morgan is a 1945 American musical-comedy film released by Metro-Goldwyn-Mayer. The film is considered one of the more unusual in the MGM canon in that it is a compilation film built around a slight plot line, with a running time of less than 60 minutes.

The film was produced for overseas (i.e. non-United States) markets and features Frank Morgan (best remembered today as the Wizard in MGM's The Wizard of Oz) appearing as himself. The premise of the film is that a bumbling Morgan is given a chance to produce a movie, but ends up botching it and accidentally editing several unrelated comedic and musical short subjects together with his own film, "The Burning Secret."

Segments include a musical number featuring dancer Eleanor Powell cut from one of her early 1940s musicals. (Some sources erroneously state the scene comes from Broadway Melody of 1938, but in fact it was a scene cut from her 1939 film Honolulu.). There also are a couple of songs by Carlos Ramirez, and a musical number by Virginia O'Brien backed by Tommy Dorsey and orchestra.

Among the non-musical segments of the film is a look at the history of the automobile in suburban America and a profile of a champion badminton player. There are also cameos by MGM supervisor of sound Douglas Shearer, art director Cedric Gibbons and costume designer Irene.

For many decades The Great Morgan was believed to be a lost film. A print was found in 1980, and another was discovered a few years later. The film was subsequently released to the American home video market and is occasionally shown on Turner Classic Movies.

External links
 

1945 films
Metro-Goldwyn-Mayer films
1945 musical comedy films
Compilation films
American musical comedy films
American black-and-white films
1940s rediscovered films
Rediscovered American films
1940s American films